Einar Askestad (born 22 March 1964) is a Swedish author.

Biography 

Askestad was raised in Portugal, Spain, Austria and Sweden. He made his debut in 1997 with the collection of short stories Det liknar ingenting. He has published prose and poetry as well as essays and articles in several magazines, published in Sweden, Finland and Norway. He has been awarded by the Swedish Academy in 2001, 2014 and 2018.

Bibliography

References 

1964 births
Swedish male writers
Swedish male novelists
Living people
People from Kalix Municipality